Arbuzovka is a rural locality (a station) and the administrative center of Arbuzovsky Selsoviet, Pavlovsky District, Altai Krai, Russia. The population was 868 as of 2013. There are 15 streets.

Geography 
Arbuzovka is located 35 km from Pavlovsk (the district's administrative centre) by road.

References 

Rural localities in Pavlovsky District, Altai Krai